Self is a surname. Notable people with the surname include:

 Austin Wayne Self (born 1996), American racing driver
 Doris Self (1925–2006), American video game competitor
 Bill Self (born 1962), American college basketball coach at the University of Kansas
 Keith Self (born 1953), American politician
 Michael Self (born 1990), American racing driver
 Will Self (born 1961), English novelist
 William Edwin Self (1921–2010), American actor and producer
 William Self (Organist) (1906–1998), American musician